Haniel (Ḥannīʾēl, "God is my grace";  Ananiēl;), also known as Hananel, Anael, Hanael or Aniel, is an angel in Jewish lore and angelology, and is often included in lists as being one of the seven archangels. Haniel is generally associated with the planet Venus, and is the archangel of the sephirah Netzach. The name Haniel derives from the Hebrew Ḥēn (חֵן), meaning "grace, favour, charm" (qualities associated with Venus) + the suffix -ʾĒl, "God". It is equivalent to the Phoenician name "Hannibal." Haniel is one of the archangels encrypted in the Sigillum Dei Aemeth of Dr. John Dee and Edward Kelly.

Popular culture
 Haniel (as Anael) appears in the strategy RPG Shin Megami Tensei: Devil Survivor as a boss depending on which route the player takes. All of her appearances are made alongside Sariel. Although angels, they take on appearances typical of "grim reaper" visages.
 In the novel Clockwork Angel by Cassandra Clare, Will names his Seraph Blade Anael at one point.
 Supernatural character Anna Milton, a fallen angel appearing in the fourth and fifth seasons of the show, is thought by her actress (Julie McNiven) to actually be the series' interpretation of Anael. However, in season 13, the actual angel by the name of Anael became a recurring character (portrayed by Danneel Ackles).
 In the book series Kushiel's Legacy, one of the angels who fall from the One God's grace to follow Elua is Anael.

Gallery

See also
 List of angels in theology

Further reading 
 Davidson, Gustav. A Dictionary of Angels: Including the Fallen Angels. Free Press. 
 Dee, John. Five Books of Mystery. edt. Joseph H. Peterson. Weiser.

References

Archangel in Judaism
Archangels in Christianity
Individual angels
Angels in Islam